The Saddle Mountain Unified School District is the school district for parts of Tonopah and Buckeye, Arizona. It serves these areas with four elementary schools (Ruth Fisher, Tartesso, Winters' Well, and Desert Sunset) and Tonopah Valley High School.

External links
 District website

School districts in Maricopa County, Arizona